This is an incomplete list of ghost towns on California sortable by town or county.

 
Calif
Ghost town
Tourist attractions in California
Ghost towns in California